María Gracia Morales Carvajal (11 November 1928 – 3 April 1995) better known as Gracita Morales was a classic Spanish film  actress with a famous high-pitched voice. She was one of the most popular Spanish actresses of the 1960s and 1970s, in both leading and supporting roles. Some of her more notable films included Atraco a las tres (1962, as Enriqueta), Sor Citroën (1967), and ¡Cómo está el servicio! (1968). She acted in many films as a maid. By the end of the 1970s she had performed in nearly 100 films. After this her health declined and her career diminished as she battled severe depression and addiction to pills. She remained active as a stage actress up until 1991. She died in Madrid on April 3, 1995 of respiratory failure.

Selected filmography

References

External links 

 

1928 births
1995 deaths
Actresses from Madrid
Spanish film actresses
20th-century Spanish actresses